7th November Cup (in French: Coupe 7 Novembre) was an international friendly football tournament that played every two years between 1991 and 1995. It was part of the November 7, 1987, commemoration ceremonies of former Tunisian President Zine El Abidine Ben Ali. Three editions played in 1991, 1993 and 1995, and Tunisia won all of them.

Results

Tournements

7th November Cup 1991

7th November Cup 1993

7th November Cup 1995

Statiscs

Attendance 

 – Champions
 – Runners-up
 – Third place
 – Fourth place
 – Semi-finals

 — Did not enter
 — Hosts

Notes and references

External links 

 7th November Cup in RSSSF

International association football competitions hosted by Tunisia
Football in Tunisia